Poljane pri Podgradu is a small village in the Municipality of Hrpelje-Kozina in the Littoral region of Slovenia close to the border with Croatia.

Name
The name of the settlement was changed from Poljane to Poljane pri Podgradu in 1953.

Church
The local church is dedicated to Saint Anthony of Padua and belongs to the Parish of Golac.

References

External links

Poljane pri Podgradu on Geopedia

Populated places in the Municipality of Hrpelje-Kozina